is a Japanese actress who has appeared in a number of television series, feature films and stage productions. She is represented by the agency FMG. She was born in Tokyo.

Biography, personal life
She debuted in 1994 in the television series Hanjuku Tamago. She attracted attention in the series Tokugawa Yoshinobu (as Chikako, Princess Kazu) and the Shin Tenmadetodoke series (as daughter Aki Sugimoto).

Known as a book enthusiast, she writes about many books in her official blog. She also wrote the serial essay "Dokusho Netsu" in the e-book literary magazine Shōsetsu-ya sari-sari of e-book store "Book Walker" (Issues September 2012 to June 2015). It was later made into the book, Koi Doku: Hon ni Koi shita 2-nen 9kagetsu released on 26 September 2015.

Filmography

TV dramas

TV anime

Travel or Trip programmes

Book review programmes

Films

Stage

Advertisements

Video media

Bibliography

Essays

Photo albums

References

Notes

Sources

External links
 – FMG 
 – Ameba Blog 

Japanese actresses
People from Tokyo
1979 births
Living people